Columella aspera is a species of very small air-breathing land snail, a terrestrial pulmonate gastropod mollusk in the family Truncatellinidae, the vertigo snails and allies.

Description
The 2.0-2.5 x 1.3-1.4 mm. shell has  4-5 whorls and the spire tapers towards the apex. The aperture is simple without teeth . The colour is dark grey brown or horny brown. The surface is not shiny and finely and regularly striated. It is more coarsely sculptured than the very similar Columella edentula.

Distribution 
This species occurs in countries and islands including:
 Czech Republic
 Great Britain
 Ireland

References

 Kerney, M.P., Cameron, R.A.D. & Jungbluth, J-H. (1983). Die Landschnecken Nord- und Mitteleuropas. Ein Bestimmungsbuch für Biologen und Naturfreunde, 384 pp., 24 plates. [Summer or later]. Hamburg / Berlin 
 Bank, R. A.; Neubert, E. (2017). Checklist of the land and freshwater Gastropoda of Europe. Last update: July 16, 2017.
 Sysoev, A. V. & Schileyko, A. A. (2009). Land snails and slugs of Russia and adjacent countries. Sofia/Moskva (Pensoft). 312 pp., 142 plates.

External links
Columella aspera at Animalbase taxonomy,short description, distribution, biology,status (threats), images

Truncatellinidae
Gastropods described in 1966